Bright Energy Investments (BEI) is a joint venture between Western Australian state-owned electricity generator and retailer Synergy, global infrastructure investment fund DIF, and Australian industry superannuation fund Cbus. It develops and owns solar and wind farms for electricity on the South West Interconnected System, the main Western Australian electricity grid.

Generation
Assets owned by BEI include:
Albany Grasmere Wind Farm
Greenough River Solar Farm
Warradarge Wind Farm (expected to start generating in 2020)

References

External links 

 Bright Energy Investment's website

renewable energy companies of Australia